This is the list of Indian films that have been or will be released in 2016.

Box office collection 
The list of highest-grossing Indian films released in 2016, by worldwide box office gross revenue, are as follows:

Lists of Indian films of 2016 

 List of Assamese films of 2016
 List of Gujarati films of 2016
 List of Hindi films of 2016
 List of Indian Bengali films of 2016
 List of Kannada films of 2016
 List of Malayalam films of 2016
 List of Marathi films of 2016
 List of Odia films of 2016
 List of Punjabi films of 2016
 List of Tamil films of 2016
 List of Telugu films of 2016
 List of Tulu films of 2016

References

External links 

 

2016
2016 in Indian cinema
Lists of 2016 films by country or language